Hunting with eagles is a traditional form of falconry found throughout the Eurasian Steppe, practiced by ancient Khitan and Turkic peoples. Today it is practiced by Kazakhs and the Kyrgyz in contemporary Kazakhstan and Kyrgyzstan, as well as diasporas in Bayan-Ölgii Provinces Bayan-Ölgii, Mongolia, and Xinjiang, China. Though these people are most famous for hunting with golden eagles, they have been known to train northern goshawks, peregrine falcons, saker falcons, and more.

Terminology 

In both Kazakh and Kyrgyz, there are separate terms for those who hunt with birds of prey in general, and those who hunt with eagles.

In Kazakh, both qusbegi and sayatshy refer to falconers in general. Qusbegi comes from the words qus ("bird") and bek ("lord"), thus literally translating as "lord of birds." In Old Turkic, kush begi was a title used for the khan's most respected advisors, reflecting the valued role of the court falconer. Sayatshy comes from the word sayat ("falconry") and the suffix -shy, used for professional titles in Turkic languages. The Kazakh word for falconers that hunt with eagles is bürkitshi, from bürkit ("golden eagle"), while the word for those that use goshawks is qarshyghashy, from qarshygha ("goshawk").

In Kyrgyz, the general word for falconers is münüshkör. A falconer who specifically hunts with eagles is a bürkütchü, from bürküt ("golden eagle").

History

Güktürks 

In Old Turkic, kush begi was a title used for the khan's most respected advisors, reflecting the valued role of the court falconer.

Khitans 
In 936-45 AD the Khitans, a nomadic people from Manchuria, conquered part of north China. In 960 AD China was conquered by the Song dynasty. From its beginnings, the Song dynasty was unable to completely control the Khitan who had already assimilated much of Chinese culture. Throughout its 300-year rule of China, the Song dynasty had to pay tribute to the Khitan to keep them from conquering additional Song dynasty territory. Despite the fact that the Khitans assimilated Chinese culture, they retained many nomadic traditions, including eagle hunting

Kyrgyz
In 1207, the Kyrgyz nomads surrendered to Genghis Khan's son Jochi. Under Mongol rule, the Kyrgyz preserved their nomadic culture as well as eagle falconry traditions. Archaeologists trace back falconry in Central Asia to the first or second millennium BC.

Kazakhs

During the communist period in Kazakhstan, many Kazakhs fled for Mongolia to avoid being forced to abandon their nomadic lifestyle and sent to collective farms. They settled in Bayan-Ölgii Province and brought with them their tradition of hunting with eagles. There are an estimated 250 eagle hunters in Bayan-Ölgii, which is located in the Altai Mountains of western Mongolia. Their falconry custom involves hunting with golden eagles on horseback, and they primarily hunt red foxes and corsac foxes. They use eagles to hunt foxes and hares during the cold winter months when it is easier to see the gold-colored foxes against the snow. Each October, Kazakh eagle hunting customs are displayed at the annual Golden Eagle Festival. Although the Kazakh government has made efforts to lure the practitioners of these Kazakh traditions back to Kazakhstan, most Kazakhs have remained in Mongolia.

See also 
 Ethnic groups in Chinese history
 Falconry
 Goryeo-Khitan Wars
 Kazakh Steppe
 Kyrgyzstan
 History of Mongolia
 The Eagle Huntress
 Wolf hunting

References 

21. McGough, Lauren's PhD thesis study entitled "Partnerships and understanding between Kazakh pastoralists and golden eagles of the Altai mountains: a multi-species ethnography" published on April 12, 2019 (University of St. Andrews). 
https://research-repository.st-andrews.ac.uk/handle/10023/18955

Further reading 

McGough, Lauren's PhD thesis study entitled "Partnerships and understanding between Kazakh pastoralists and golden eagles of the Altai mountains: a multi-species ethnography" published on April 12, 2019 (University of St. Andrews). https://research-repository.st-andrews.ac.uk/handle/10023/18955

 Keen, Dennis. 2014. 'The Central Asian Falconry Project'. 
 Soma, Takuya. 2012. ‘Contemporary Falconry in Altai-Kazakh in Western Mongolia’The International Journal of Intangible Heritage (vol.7), pp. 103–111. 
 Soma, Takuya. 2012. ‘Ethnoarhchaeology of Horse-Riding Falconry’, The Asian Conference on the Social Sciences 2012 - Official Conference Proceedings, pp. 167–182. 
 Soma, Takuya. 2012. ‘Intangible Cultural Heritage of Arts and Knowledge for Coexisting with Golden Eagles: Ethnographic Studies in “Horseback Eagle-Hunting” of Altai-Kazakh Falconers’, The International Congress of Humanities and Social Sciences Research, pp. 307–316. 
 Soma, Takuya. 2012. ‘The Art of Horse-Riding Falconry by Altai-Kazakh Falconers’. In HERITAGE 2012 (vol.2) - Proceedings of the 3rd International Conference on Heritage and Sustainable Development, edited by Rogério Amoêda, Sérgio Lira, & Cristina Pinheiro, pp. 1499–1506. Porto: Green Line Institute for Sustainable Development. .
 Soma, Takuya. 2012. ‘Horse-Riding Falconry in Altai-Kazakh Nomadic Society: Anthropological Researches in Summertime Activities of Falconers and Golden Eagle’. Japanese Journal of Human and Animal Relation 32: pp. 38–47 (written in Japanese).  
 Soma, Takuya. 2013. ‘Ethnographic Study of Altaic Kazakh Falconers’, Falco: The Newsletter of the Middle East Falcon Research Group 41, pp. 10–14. 
 Soma, Takuya. 2013. ‘Ethnoarchaeology of Ancient Falconry in East Asia’, The Asian Conference on Cultural Studies 2013 - Official Conference Proceedings, pp. 81–95. 
 Soma, Takuya. 2013. ‘Hunting Arts of Eagle Falconers in the Altai-Kazakhs: Contemporary Operations of Horse-Riding Falconry in Sagsai County, Western Mongolia’. Japanese Journal of Human and Animal Relation 35:　pp. 58–66 (written in Japanese).
 Soma, Takuya & Battulga, Sukhee. 2014. 'Altai Kazakh Falconry as Heritage Tourism: “The Golden Eagle Festival” of Western Mongolia', "The International Journal of Intangible Heritage vol. 9", edited by Alissandra Cummins, pp. 135–148. Seoul: The National Folk Museum of Korea.  
 Takuya Soma. 2014. ‘Eagle Hunters in Action: hunting practice of Altaic Kazakh falconers in Western Mongolia’, Falco: The Newsletter of the Middle East Falcon Research Group 44, pp. 16–20. 
 Takuya Soma. 2014. Human and Raptor Interactions in the Context of a Nomadic Society: Anthropological and Ethno-Ornithological Studies of Altaic Kazakh Falconry and its Cultural Sustainability in Western Mongolia (PhD Thesis submitted to University of Kassel, 20 August 2014)

External links
 Article on eagle hunting in Kyrgyzstan with pictures
 Altai eagle hunting article
 Golden Eagle Festival

Falconry
Central Asian culture
Kazakhstani culture
Kyrgyzstani culture
Ethnic Kyrgyz culture